This is a list of museums in Åland.

Museums in Åland 

Åland Maritime Museum
Åland Museum
Kastelholm Castle
Pommern (ship)

See also 

 List of museums
 List of archives in Åland
 List of libraries in Åland

External links 

Museums
 
Aland